The Deutsche Schule Valencia (DSV; , CAV) is a German international school in Valencia, Spain. It serves preschool through senior high school levels.

References

External links
  Deutsche Schule Valencia
  Deutsche Schule Valencia

Schools in Valencia
German international schools in Spain
Private schools in Spain